Karol Wojtyła is the birth name of Pope John Paul II.

Karol Wojtyla may also refer to:

 Karol Wojtyła (senior), the father of John Paul II
 Bari Karol Wojtyła Airport, Bari, Italy

See also

 
 
 Saint John Paul II (disambiguation)
 Pope John Paul II (disambiguation)
 John Paul II (disambiguation)
 Wojtyła, a surname
 Wojtyła, a surname
 Karol (disambiguation)